The 366th Bombardment Squadron is an inactive United States Air Force unit. Its last assignment was as part of the 305th Bombardment Wing, stationed at Grissom Air Force Base, Indiana. It was inactivated on 1 January 1970.

History

World War II
Established in June 1942 as a Boeing B-17 Flying Fortress heavy bombardment squadron, the squadron trained under the Second Air Force; it deployed to the European Theater of Operations in September 1942, being assigned to VIII Bomber Command in England. It began flying long-range strategic bombardment missions on 17 November 1942 and attacked such targets as submarine pens, docks, harbors, shipyards, vehicle factories and marshalling yards in France, Germany and the Low Countries. It continued attacks on enemy cities, manufacturing centers, transportation links and other targets until the German capitulation in May 1945.

After combat missions ended, the squadron moved to Sint-Truiden Air Base in Belgium in July 1945 where it conducted photo-mapping and intelligence-gathering flights called Project Casey Jones over Europe and North Africa. On 15 December 1945, it moved to Lechfeld Airfield, Germany which it had bombed on 18 March 1944 and now used as an occupation base. The squadron was inactivated on December 1946 in Germany.

Strategic Air Command
The squadron was reactivated under Strategic Air Command (SAC) in 1951 with Boeing B-47 Stratojet medium jet bombers, originally B-47As,then B-47Bs. It began flying operational strategic bombardment and refueling missions from MacDill Air Force Base, Florida.  In 1955, SAC upgraded the squadron to the B-47E, the major production version of the Stratojet. The squadron, still with B-47s, moved to Bunker Hill Air Force Base, Indiana in May 1959.

B-58 operations
The squadron began training crews on the Convair B-58 Hustler in 1961, replacing its Stratojets.  The squadron also was equipped with training models of the Hustler.

At the beginning of the Cuban Missile Crisis in October 1962, Only six B-58s in the entire SAC inventory were on alert. Even these aircraft were "second cycle" (follow on) sorties.  Training was suspended, and the squadron, along with SAC's other B-58 squadrons, began placing its bombers on alert.  By the first week of November, 84 B-58s were standing nuclear alert, and as SAC redeployed its Boeing KC-135 Stratotankers, 20 of these were "first cycle" sorties. Within a short time, this grew to 41 bombers.  By 20 November, SAC resumed its normal alert posture, and half the squadron's aircraft were kept on alert.

In December 1965, Robert S. McNamara, Secretary of Defense announced a phaseout program that would further reduce SAC’s bomber force. This program called for the mid-1971 retirement of all B-58s and some Boeing B-52 Stratofortress models.  With the removal of the B-58 from SAC's bomber force, the squadron was inactivated in January 1970.

Lineage
 Constituted as the 366th Bombardment Squadron (Heavy) on 28 June 1942
 Activated on 1 March 1942
 Redesignated 366th Bombardment Squadron, Heavy on 20 August 1943
 Inactivated on 25 December 1946
 Redesignated 366th Bombardment Squadron, Very Heavy on 11 June 1947
 Activated on 1 July 1947
 Inactivated on 6 September 1948
 Redesignated 366th Bombardment Squadron, Medium on 20 December 1950
 Activated on 2 January 1951
 Inactivated on 1 January 1970

Assignments
 305th Bombardment Group, 1 March 1942 – 25 December 1946
 305th Bombardment Group, 1 Jul 1947 – 6 Sep 1948
 305th Bombardment Group, 2 January 1951 (attached to 305th Bombardment Wing after 10 February 1951)
 305th Bombardment Wing, 16 June 1952 – 1 January 1970

Stations

 Salt Lake City Army Air Base, Utah, 1 March 1942
 Geiger Field, Washington, 11 June 1942
 Muroc Army Air Field, California, 4 July 1942
 Fort Dix Army Air Base, New Jersey, 29 August-4 September 1942
 RAF Grafton Underwood (AAF-106), England, 13 September 1942
 RAF Chelveston (AAF-105), England, 11 December 1942

 Sint-Truiden Airfield (A-92), Belgium, 25 July 1945
 AAF Station Lechfeld (R-71), Germany, 19 December 1945 – 25 December 1946
 Andrews Field (later Andrews Air Force Base), Maryland, 1 July 1947 – 6 September 1948
 MacDill Air Force Base, Florida, 2 January 1951
 Bunker Hill Air Force Base (later Grissom Air Force Base), Indiana, 1 June 1959 – 1 January 1970

Aircraft

 Boeing B-17 Flying Fortress, 1942–1946
 Boeing B-29 Superfortress, 1951-1953
 Boeing B-47A Stratojet, 1952-1953
 Boeing B-47B Stratojet, 1953–1955
 Boeing B-47E Stratojet, 1955–1961
 Convair B-58 Hustler, 1961–1970

References

Notes
 Explanatory notes

 Citations

Bibliography

 
 
 
 
 
 
 
 

Bombardment squadrons of the United States Air Force
Bombardment squadrons of the United States Army Air Forces
Military units and formations established in 1942
Military units and formations disestablished in 1970
1942 establishments in Utah
1970 disestablishments in Indiana